The Federal Civil Defense Authority was established in the United States Department of Defense (DOD), by DOD Directive 5105.43, May 5, 1972.

Predecessor agencies

 Federal Civil Defense Administration (FCDA), Office for Emergency Management (OEM), Executive Office of the President (EOP, 1950–1951)
 FCDA (1951–1958)
 Office of Defense and Civilian Mobilization (ODCM), EOP (1958)
 Office of Civil and Defense Mobilization (OCDM), EOP (1958–1961)
 Office of Civil Defense (OCD), DOD (1961–1964)
 OCD, United States Department of the Army, DOD (1964–1972)

Functions
It coordinated and directed federal, state, and local civil defense program activities, including fallout shelters; chemical, biological, and radiological warfare defense; emergency communications and warning systems; post-attack assistance and damage assessment; preparedness planning; and government continuity.

Abolished
By EO 12148, July 20, 1979, retroactive to July 15, 1979, pursuant to Reorganization Plan No. 3 of 1978, effective April 1, 1979.

Successor agencies 
Federal Emergency Management Agency (FEMA).

See also
Federal Civil Defense Administration

References

Agencies of the United States government
Defunct agencies of the United States government
United States civil defense